"Irregular Around the Margins" is the 57th episode of the HBO original series The Sopranos and the fifth of the show's fifth season. Written by Robin Green and Mitchell Burgess, and directed by Allen Coulter, it originally aired on April 4, 2004.

Starring
 James Gandolfini as Tony Soprano
 Lorraine Bracco as Dr. Jennifer Melfi 
 Edie Falco as Carmela Soprano
 Michael Imperioli as Christopher Moltisanti
 Dominic Chianese as Corrado Soprano, Jr. 
 Steven Van Zandt as Silvio Dante
 Tony Sirico as Paulie Gualtieri
 Robert Iler as Anthony Soprano, Jr. 
 Jamie-Lynn DiScala as Meadow Soprano
 Drea de Matteo as Adriana La Cerva
 Aida Turturro as Janice Soprano Baccalieri *
 Steven R. Schirripa as Bobby Baccalieri
 Kathrine Narducci as Charmaine Bucco
 Steve Buscemi as Tony Blundetto

* = credit only

Guest starring
 Jerry Adler as Hesh Rabkin

Also guest starring

Synopsis

Tony has a mole removed, later determined to be a squamous skin cancer. Adriana is being treated for irritable bowel syndrome caused by stress. Tony spends more time at her club and, with Christopher traveling to North Carolina on a cigarette smuggling job, is alone with her in her office. The two bond over recent problems and snort cocaine together. They are about to kiss but are interrupted. Tony resumes his psychiatric therapy; he tells Dr. Melfi that a relationship with Adriana would lead to problems with both Chris and Carmela. Melfi commends Tony for this breakthrough in therapy.

On the eve of Chris' return, Tony and Adriana drive to Dover to buy cocaine. Tony swerves to avoid a raccoon, and his SUV flips over to the driver's side. Tony is released from the hospital unhurt. Adriana is bruised and has a head injury. Tony suggests a cover story to explain why they were alone together in the early morning: they were going to get something to eat. However, Tony's crew and their associates play an unintentional game of "telephone" with the story of the accident. The details get more elaborate and lurid with each retelling; the final version is that Adriana was fellating him when the accident happened.

Chris learns of the accident from his crew and is immediately suspicious. At Satriale's, he loses his temper and nearly starts a fight with Vito, who is now a capo. At a face-to-face meeting, Tony turns the conversation against Chris, telling him he does not deserve a woman as good-looking as Adriana. He swears on his children that the rumors of their affair are untrue. At home, Adriana admits that she and Tony were going to see her drug dealer, but insists that nothing happened between them. Chris batters her and physically throws her out. He then relapses.

Chris, drunk, arrives at the Bing and empties his pistol into Tony's car before entering the club, where he is overpowered. Tony and his crew take him to the Meadowlands, where Tony prepares to execute him if he doesn't acknowledge that nothing happened. However, at Tony B's suggestion, Chris is taken to the doctor who treated Tony and Adriana on the night of the accident. Though they are threatening him, the doctor freely acknowledges that Adriana's injuries show that she was wearing her seat belt and sitting upright when the accident occurred. Chris, though placated, feels like a laughing stock.
 
Agent Sanseverino, believing the final version of the story of Adriana and Tony, wants Adriana to exploit their supposed relationship by planting listening devices in her club. Adriana is furious and moves to get out of the car. As she is leaving, Sanseverino tries to warn her that by staying with Chris she is protecting her abuser.

Tony convinces Carmela that there is nothing between him and Adriana. In a show of unity, Tony and Carmela, Chris and Adriana, and Tony B and Quintina Blundetto arrive to dine at Nuovo Vesuvio, where most of Tony's crew are eating at other tables. Vito approaches them and shakes Chris' hand, wishing him a pleasant evening, resolving the tension between them.

Production
 Tony's burgundy 1999 Chevy Suburban is seen for the last time in this episode (he was last seen driving it in the closing scene of the season 4 finale). He had upgraded to a black Cadillac Escalade at the beginning of season 5 (and drives/is driven in a white 2003 Escalade from the middle of this season onwards).

First appearances
 Frankie Cortese: a soldier in the Soprano family. He is one of the two bodyguards who subdued Christopher when he comes into the Bada Bing to confront Tony
 Jason Molinaro: a member of the Aprile crew

Title reference
 Tony tells Adriana that he's afraid a mole on his shoulder looks "irregular around the margins," a worry he's had ever since a cancerous mole was removed from his forehead.

Awards
 Allen Coulter was nominated for the Primetime Emmy Award for Outstanding Directing for a Drama Series for his work on this episode.
 Mitchell Burgess and Robin Green were nominated for the Primetime Emmy Award for Outstanding Writing for a Drama Series for their work on this episode.
 Drea de Matteo won the Primetime Emmy Award for Outstanding Supporting Actress in a Drama Series for her performance in this episode.
 Michael Imperioli won the Primetime Emmy Award for Outstanding Supporting Actor in a Drama Series for his performance in this episode.

Music
 The song that plays during the meeting in the Crazy Horse, when Adriana comes in, is "Beat Connection" from LCD Soundsystem.
 The song that plays while Tony and Adriana use cocaine at the Crazy Horse is "Come for Me" by Little Steven and the Lost Boys. The band's singer, Steven Van Zandt, plays Silvio Dante on the show.
 The music that plays during the final restaurant scene and over the closing credits is the aria, "Chi il bel sogno di Doretta?", from La rondine, an opera by Giacomo Puccini sung by Luba Orgonasova. The same aria was used in the pilot episode, when Tony got his first panic attack at the moment the ducks left his pool. The song describes a woman who rejects a king as a suitor in favor of a student.

References

External links
"Irregular Around the Margins"  at HBO

The Sopranos (season 5) episodes
2004 American television episodes
Television episodes directed by Allen Coulter